Bairia is a village in West Champaran district in the Indian state of Bihar.

Demographics
 India census, Bairia had a population of 2730 in 474 households. Males constitute 51.64% of the population and females 48.35%. Bairia has an average literacy rate of 44.1%, lower than the national average of 74%: male literacy is 64.36%, and female literacy is 35.63%. In Bairia, 22.96% of the population is under 6 years of age.

References

Villages in West Champaran district